The scaled antpitta (Grallaria guatimalensis) is a species of bird in the family Grallariidae.

It is found in Bolivia, Brazil, Colombia, Costa Rica, Ecuador, El Salvador, Guatemala, Guyana, Honduras, Mexico, Nicaragua, Panama, Peru, Trinidad and Tobago, and Venezuela. Its natural habitats are subtropical or tropical moist lowland forests and subtropical or tropical moist montane forests.

References

scaled antpitta
Birds of Central America
Birds of Mexico
Birds of Guatemala
Birds of Honduras
Birds of Nicaragua
Birds of Costa Rica
Birds of Panama
Birds of the Northern Andes
Birds of the Venezuelan Amazon
Birds of Ecuador
Birds of Trinidad and Tobago
scaled antpitta
scaled antpitta
Taxonomy articles created by Polbot